"Go" (stylised as "GO" or "GO!") is a song by Australian rapper and singer the Kid Laroi and American rapper and singer Juice Wrld, released on 12 June 2020 as the first single from Laroi's debut mixtape F*ck Love, released on 24 July 2020. The song was recorded while the two, who were close friends, met up in Greece in 2019. That recording is included in the song's official video, with both the song and video serving as a tribute to Juice Wrld who died in December 2019.

Background
Prior to recording "Go", the Kid Laroi and Juice Wrld were already familiar with each other; Laroi considered Juice Wrld, who was his mentor, his "big brother" and had opened shows for Juice's final tour in Sydney and Melbourne, Australia, in 2019, and was subsequently signed by Juice's managers, Grade A Productions. On the night of Laroi's 16th birthday in August 2019, Laroi played Juice a demo, and Juice freestyled a verse, which would end being the verse heard on "Go". The song leaked a while before its release, and was described as "the first taste" of Laroi's debut commercial mixtape F*ck Love, which was released on 24 July 2020. "Go" was released as the seventh track out of fifteen on the mixtape. To accommodate for the song being leaked, Laroi remade his verse before the song's release as a single. 
To coincide with the song's release, the Kid Laroi posted a photo on social media of himself and Juice, stating:

Composition
"Go" was produced by Tito Beats, Neek, and Omer Fedi and finds both rappers addressing their relationship issues.
Eddie Fu of Genius noted in Juice Wrld's verse, he "references his drug addictions before apologizing to his significant other", while Laroi "gives similar promises of loyalty on the pre-chorus".

Critical reception
Billboards John Norris said the two artists' voices blend "effortlessly". Alex Zidel of HotNewHipHop said "Go" speaks to the Kid Laroi's potential as a melody-making star and, "so young, he has all the right tools to mold himself into one of the biggest artists in the world some day". Triple J's Al Newstead found the two artists' chemistry works "so well, so it's a damn shame Laroi and Juice won't get to collab again". He further stated "It's still raw hearing Juice rap about perky with the lean given the circumstances of the 21-year-old's death, but there's beauty in hearing him vibe with his South Sydney protege, Laroi, who continues to flex star-in-the-making quality".

Chart performance
In the Kid Laroi's native Australia, "Go" debuted at number 23, the highest new entry on the ARIA Singles Chart for the chart dated 22 June 2020. On the US Billboard Hot 100, it debuted at number 52, becoming the Kid Laroi's first Hot 100 entry.

Music video
The official video, directed by Steve Cannon, premiered on 11 June 2020, the day before the song's release. Laroi said the whole concept of the video was "to capture and remember the moments me and Juice made together when we created this in Greece". The visual begins with Juice apologizing for not attending Laroi's 16th birthday party. He promises to gift his friend $200,000 in the form of a verse. Scenes of Juice WRLD are interspersed throughout the video, showing him in the studio, at a live show, and being casual. The video also alternates between "heart-rending" road footage of Juice and Laroi, and cuts to scenes shot in 2019, in Los Angeles, where Laroi is seen with a biker crew, and alone on a balcony, in front of a mic that recalls the one used by Juice at the beginning of the clip, as well as Juice also singing his verse in the studio in a few short 
parts of the video.

Response
Billboards John Norris described the visual as "melancholy and affecting, but somehow, also lighthearted". Amnplify Australia called the video nostalgic, noting how it features some of the intimate moments between the two rappers and "embodies the endearing dynamic that resulted in the creation of the song. The video is essentially an ode to friendship and closeness and a way for The Kid Laroi to honour his mentor".

Charts

Weekly charts

Year-end charts

Certifications

References

2020 singles
2020 songs
Juice Wrld songs
The Kid Laroi songs
Songs written by the Kid Laroi
Songs written by Juice Wrld
Songs released posthumously
Columbia Records singles
Songs written by Omer Fedi
Song recordings produced by Omer Fedi